Browns Pond, in the Town of New Windsor in Orange County, New York, United States, is the smaller of two reservoirs for the nearby City of Newburgh. The 0.3 square mile pond is hook-shaped, with the circuitous Mount Airy Road running past both ends.

Its outlet streams ultimately feed Silver Stream, which is a tributary of the Moodna Creek. The Catskill Aqueduct, which the city uses as a supplementary supply, runs between the two.

Unlike Lake Washington, there are no recreational facilities on the reservoir.

References

See also
List of reservoirs and dams in New York

Reservoirs in New York (state)
Protected areas of Orange County, New York
Newburgh, New York
New Windsor, New York
Reservoirs in Orange County, New York